Diadegma mollipla is a wasp which parasitises the larvae of the diamondback moth and the potato tuber moth. The species was first described by August Holmgren in 1868. Its range includes the Canary Islands, Britain and parts of Africa.

See also 
Parasitoid wasp

References

Further reading 

Holmgren, A. E. (1868.) "Hymenoptera. Species novas descripsit.", Kongliga Svenska Fregatten Eugenies Resa omkring jorden. Zoologi. 6 :391–442.
Taxapad Ichneumonoidea. Yu D.S.K., May 4, 2009
Cameron, P. (1905). "On some new genera and species of Hymenoptera from Cape Colony and Transvaal". Transactions of the South African Philosophical Society. 15: 195–257.
Cameron, P. (1906). "Descriptions of new species of parasitic Hymenoptera chiefly in the collection of the South African Museum, Cape Town". Annals of the South African Museum. 5: 17–186.
Cameron, P. (1905). "On the Hymenoptera of the Albany Museum, Grahamstown, South Africa (Third paper)". Record of the Albany Museum. 1: 297–314.

External links 
Species 2000 & ITIS Catalogue of Life: 2011 Annual Checklist
"Diadegma mollipla (Holmgren)". WaspWeb.

Insects described in 1868
Taxa named by August Holmgren
mollipla

Biological pest control wasps